Đồng Nai Stadium is a multi-use stadium located in Biên Hòa City, Đồng Nai Province, Vietnam. The stadium holds 30,000 people and mostly used for football matches. It is the home stadium of Đồng Nai F.C.

History
In 2013, the stadium was fitted with a lighting system which cost over 20 billion Vietnamese đồng (around ). The whole lighting system was imported from the United States; it is one of the best quality lighting systems for stadia in Vietnam.

In 2014, the stadium had an outdoor track installed which enables it to hold athletics events at national and international level; it cost over 20 billion Vietnamese đồng.

References

Bien Hoa
Football venues in Vietnam
Buildings and structures in Đồng Nai province